Pretty Deadly are a English professional wrestling tag team consisting of Elton Prince (born 21 May 1997) and Kit Wilson (born 4 August 1994). They are currently signed to WWE, where they perform on the NXT brand, and are former NXT Tag Team Champions and NXT UK Tag Team Champions with three reigns.

Professional wrestling career

Independent circuit (2015–2020) 
Howley and Stoker debuted as a tag team on 2 February 2019 on Hustle Wrestling Live in Enfield by defeating Justin Case and Justin Vincible in a tag team match. However, they were briefly active one time under the name of Greased Lightning in a match against Lance Lawrence and Oliver Peace on the 14 November 2015 episode of WrestleForce Live in Basingstoke. Stoker was previously known as Sammy Smooth. After that, they both returned to competing as singles wrestlers. They are also known for their tenures with professional wrestling promotions such as Progress Wrestling and Revolution Pro Wrestling. During their International Pro Wrestling: United Kingdom affiliation, they captured the IPW:UK Tag Team Championship one time as Pretty Bastards and one time as The Collective also teaming up with James Castle as a freebird trio.

WWE (2020–present) 
They had sporadic appearances across NXT UK in 2019 before making their official WWE debut in a losing effort to Wild Boar and Primate. They were forced to take a six-month hiatus before returning to United Kingdom and turning in their first victory in WWE. Howley and Stoker became the number one contenders for the NXT UK Tag Team Championship on 28 January 2021 after defeating Mark Andrews and Flash Morgan Webster, Oliver Carter and Ashton Smith and The Hunt (Wild Boar and Primate) in a four-way tag team match.

NXT UK Tag Team Champions (2021–2022) 
Cementing their villainous status, they defeated Gallus (Mark Coffey and Wolfgang) to capture the NXT UK Tag Team Championship on the 25 February 2021 edition of NXT UK. They would retain the titles against Amir Jordan and Kenny Williams on the 1 April episode of NXT UK after Williams turned on Jordan. On the 4 June episode of NXT UK, Pretty Deadly would successfully defend their titles against Jack Starz and Nathan Frazer. On the 22 July episode NXT UK, they would retain against Subculture's Mark Andrews and Flash Morgan. On the 19 August episode of NXT UK, Pretty Deadly would retain against Moustache Mountain (Trent Seven and Tyler Bate). However, they would lose the titles to Moustache Mountain in a rematch on the 9 December episode of NXT UK, ending their reign at 287 days.

NXT Tag Team Champions (2022–present) 
On the 5 April episode of NXT, Pretty Deadly, now under the ring names of Elton Prince and Kit Wilson, revealed themselves as the Creed Brothers' attackers after they defeated Imperium (Fabian Aichner and Marcel Barthel), effectively making their debut on the NXT brand. The following week, they would defeat the Creed Brothers in a gauntlet match, involving Legado Del Fantasma (Raul Mendoza and Joaquin Wilde), Josh Briggs and Brooks Jensen, and Grayson Waller and Sanga, to win the vacant NXT Tag Team Championship, making them the first tag team to win the titles on their NXT debut and the second team to hold both the NXT and NXT UK Tag Team Championship. They lost the tag titles to the Creed Brothers on 4 June at In Your House, ending their first reign at 53 days. On the 19 July episode of NXT, Pretty Deadly fought Josh Briggs and Brooks Jensen for the NXT UK Tag Team Championship in a losing effort. At Worlds Collide on 4 September, Pretty Deadly defeated the Creed Brothers, Gallus and Brooks Jensen and Josh Briggs in a Fatal 4-Way Tag Team Elimination Match to unify the NXT and NXT UK Tag Team Championships. At NXT Deadline, Pretty Deadly lost the NXT Tag Team Championship to The New Day (Kofi Kingston and Xavier Woods), ending their second reign at 98 days.

Personal lives
Howley originates from Grays, England, and Stoker originates from London, England.
In 2017, Howley appeared on an episode of First Dates.

Championships and accomplishments
International Pro Wrestling: United Kingdom
IPW:UK Tag Team Championship (2 times) – with James Castle (1)
WWE
NXT Tag Team Championship (2 times)
NXT UK Tag Team Championship (1 time)

References

External links
Pretty Deadly profile at Cagematch.net

Independent promotions teams and stables
WWE teams and stables
British professional wrestlers
WWE NXT teams and stables
NXT Tag Team Champions
NXT UK Tag Team Champions